Mannhai is a Finnish stoner rock band from Helsinki. The band was formed in late 1999 by bass player Olli-Pekka "Oppu" Laine and guitarist Ilkka "Ile" Laaksomaa. Soon they were accompanied by a young drummer, Mikko "Junior" Pietinen, and the following year by lead singer Jani "Joãnitor" Muurinen.

In 2004, Muurinen left the band after three albums. In 2005 Mannhai persuaded Pasi Koskinen to replace Muurinen as a vocalist. Koskinen is best known for being the lead singer of Amorphis during the years 1996–2004.

The band's name Mannhai comes from an Indian belief. In the countryside of the state of Uttar Pradesh in India, people in villages believed an evil disguised spirit called the Mannhai snatched their children at nightfall.

History
Olli-Pekka Laine, Ilkka Laaksomaa and Mikko Pietinen recorded three instrumental songs to begin with. With this demo tape, they convinced their old friend Jani Muurinen to become their singer. In late 2000 another three-song demo tape was released and given to Spinefarm Records which led to the band signing a recording contract. Without a single live gig, Mannhai started to record their first album.

Their debut album The Sons of Yesterday's Black Grouse in 2001 attracted interest. Mannhai started intense touring until August 2002, when they returned to the studio to record their second record. With the second album Evil under the Sun, Mannhai topped its predecessor. The record includes the song and music video for "Spiritraiser", directed by Tuukka Temonen (former bass player of the Finnish punk/hardcore group Apulanta).

In 2004 the third album, The Exploder, was released, which is more experimental than the group's other albums. The third album has significant influences from progressive metal and 1970s heavy metal, as well as from blues with Maria Hänninen singing backing vocals on some tracks and Esa Kuloniemi from Honey B and the T-bones playing slide guitar on some others. The record has a more complicated and scattered feel, including only a few straightforward rock and roll songs. The keyboards played by Kasper Mårtenson (ex-Amorphis) also add to the progressive feel. The band played a prank when The Exploder came out: the web address www.mattivanhanen.com directed websurfers not to the web page of then-Prime Minister of Finland Matti Vanhanen but to the band's website instead.

In November 2004 in Tavastia Club, a popular rock venue in Helsinki, Muurinen played his last gig as a member of Mannhai. Muurinen left the band to pursue his artistic studies. During this time Muurinen had lived and studied in Turku while the rest of the band had always maintained their home base in Helsinki.

In the spring of 2005 Mannhai got a new lead singer, Trond Skog, previous vocalist for Norwegian stoner rock band Honcho. Mannhai went on a three-week Central European tour. However, in the middle of the tour the band relieved Skog from his singing duties for good. Without a vocalist, Laine, in despair, called his old bandmate Pasi Koskinen from Amorphis. To his, surprise Koskinen agreed and flew to Berlin to step into the frontman's shoes. After the tour he officially joined the band.

With the new line-up, Mannhai started to work on a new album, with Koskinen writing most of the lyrics. The fourth album, Hellroad Caravan, came out in the beginning of 2006. The third track, "Spaceball", went to the top of the singles list on the Finnish charts. The new album was very compact and straightforward, groovy stoner rock. Most of the digressing that filled The Exploder was removed. The role of the keyboards stayed behind the rumbling bass heavy guitar sound, with only a hint of psychedelia. Henri Sorvali played keyboards, best known for his work in folk/pagan metal band Moonsorrow.

Mannhai's song "Spiritraiser" is often featured on Finnish television show The Dudesons as well as in their movie.

In late 2006, drummer Junior Pietinen left the band to work full-time on his other groups Bleak and Happiness. For the forthcoming European tour Mannhai took Nalle Österman as a sideman for drums. Nalle Österman has worked with Oppu Laine in the death metal band Chaosbreed as well.

After Pietinen departed the band, Mannhai has only played a few gigs per year, most of them abroad at festivals like Ragnarock Open Air Festival. No new music has been composed or published as a band since 2007. With Mannhai inactive, Olli-Pekka Laine aimed his musical focus at a new band, Barren Earth, with previous Mannhai and Amorphis bandmate Kasper Mårtenson as keyboardist. 5 February 2009 Mannhai officially announced on their website that they are on indefinite hiatus.

Members
Mannhai was formed by Oppu Laine and Ile Laaksomaa. Oppu Laine has played bass guitar in bands like Amorphis and Chaosbreed. Original vocalist Jani Muurinen (a.k.a. "Joãnitor" or "Janitor") used to be a singer in Xysma before Mannhai. Janitor's successor Pasi Koskinen, a former Amorphis member as well, has vocal duties in his other bands Shape of Despair and Ajattara. Mikko Pietinen ("Junior") moved on to play with his other bands Bleak (disbanded 2009) and Happiness. Tour drummer Nalle Österman has been in bands like Chaosbreed, Gandalf and Lullacry and is the drummer for Sonic Roots.

Current line-up
 Olli-Pekka "Oppu" Laine – bass guitar 1999-
 Ilkka "Ile" Laaksomaa – guitar 1999-
 Pasi Koskinen – vocals 2005-
 Nalle Österman – tour drummer 2006–

Former members
 Mikko "Junior" Pietinen – drums 1999–2006
 Jani "Joãnitor" Muurinen – vocals 2000–2004
 Kasper Mårtenson – keyboards 2003–2004

Discography

Albums
 The Sons of Yesterday's Black Grouse (2001)
 Evil Under the Sun (2002)
 The Exploder (2004)
 Hellroad Caravan (2006)

Singles
 "Spiritraiser / "A New Day Yesterday" (Jethro Tull cover) (2003)
 "Rock to the Top" / "Slave to the Flame" / "Live Wire" (Mötley Crüe cover) (2004)
 "Spaceball" / "Rocketeer" (2005)
 "Under the Sign of the Wolf" (split single with Reverend Bizarre) "Forever My Queen" (Pentagram cover) (2006)

Videography
 "Spiritraiser" – from the album Evil Under the Sun
 "Rock to the Top" – from the album The Exploder
 "Spaceball" – from the album Hellroad Caravan

References

External links
 Official website 
 Mannhai at MySpace 

Finnish heavy metal musical groups
Finnish stoner rock musical groups